Rail is a short 13.5 minute documentary film made by Geoffrey Jones for British Transport Films between 1963 and 1967, prompted by the success of Snow.

Summary
The "pure cinema" film illustrated the transition from steam powered locomotives to diesel and electric traction which was taking place during that period.

Production
Nominated for a BAFTA Film Award for Best Short Film in 1968, it took four years to make. During this time British Railways changed their branding to "British Rail", as well as their livery, which required Jones to modify his plans for the film on his return from filming Trinidad And Tobago in 1964.

References

External links

Rail on YouTube

1967 films
1960s short documentary films
British short documentary films
1967 documentary films
British Transport Films
1960s British films